Edson de Castro (born 1938) is a computer engineer and businessman, perhaps best known for designing the Data General Nova series of computers.

De Castro was founder and CEO of Data General Corporation throughout the 1970s, the 1980s and into the 1990s when he was replaced by Ronald L Skates, a former Price Waterhouse Coopers partner. He also was the project manager in charge of developing the PDP-8 mini computer at Digital Equipment Corporation, before leaving to form Data General Corporation. As CEO of Data General, he appeared in Tracy Kidder's book The Soul of a New Machine.

DeCastro married Jean DeCastro in Norwich, Connecticut, in 1963. Jean was a school teacher and Edson worked at Digital Equipment. They divorced in 1980.

Books

References 

Computer hardware engineers
American technology chief executives
1938 births
Living people